Ferry is a ghost town in Ferry County, Washington, United States. Ferry was founded during the late 1890s. The town was located to the west of Vulcan Mountain. Ferry was a ramshackle collection of crude log homes and false front buildings to support the mining boom in the area. By 1910, insurance fires took their toll and before long Ferry had passed into oblivion. Today little remains of the town.

See also
 Ferry-Midway Border Crossing

References

Ghost towns in Washington (state)